Skeleton Waterholes Creek is a waterway in the outer western and outer south-western regions of Melbourne, Victoria. The creek originates near Mount Cottrell, to the south of Rockbank, and passes through rural land until it reaches the suburban areas of Tarneit, Truganina, Hoppers Crossing, Altona Meadows and Point Cook before it flows into Port Phillip Bay after the Cheetham Wetlands. The creek has important local Aboriginal spiritual significance, and parts of the creek are popular sites for recreation(various).

Environmental condition 
It has been classed as being in "moderate condition" by Melbourne Water, but it is becoming increasingly urbanised as new developments extend across the catchment from Hoppers Crossing and surrounding areas. This new development poses a major risk to the health of the river, as does the poor quality of both the creek's water and streamside vegetation along significant parts of the waterway.

A recent defence force study of PFAS contamination on defence bases has indicated some groundwater contamination from sites at the partially decommissioned Williams Landing airforce base. Hydrological studies show that this groundwater flows into Skeleton Creek, and caution should be taken with consuming fish and eels from this creek.

See also 
Skeleton Creek Trail, a cycling and walking trail along the southern part of the creek.

References

External links 
Healthy Waterways - Waterwatch Program - Your Local Waterway >  Werribee Catchment > Skeleton Creek
Parks Victoria: Cheetham Wetlands page

Melbourne Water catchment
Rivers of Greater Melbourne (region)